The  was a Japanese high-speed Shinkansen train type, with a top operational speed of 270 km/h (170 mph), which operated on the Tokaido and Sanyo Shinkansen lines in Japan between 1992 and 2012. As more were delivered (66 trains by 1998) they replaced earlier units on Hikari service and allowed the thus displaced 100 series units to finally in turn displace 0 series units on almost all services.

With the introduction of newer 700 series and N700 series equipment, the 300 series sets were gradually demoted to slower Hikari and  Kodama services, and were completely withdrawn from Tokaido and Sanyo Shinkansen services by the start of the revised timetable on 17 March 2012.

Design
The front-end styling of these units consisted of a 'curved wedge', replacing the aircraft-style nose-cones of previous Shinkansen trains. The furthest forward point was the very bottom of the pilot. They were painted brilliant white with a medium-thick blue stripe beneath the windows.

They were only formed as sixteen-car sets and had no restaurant cars, though they did originally feature two refreshment counters (later removed).

Technically, they are notable for being the first Shinkansen sets to employ three-phase AC traction motors instead of direct current units, as well as new bolsterless bogies to reduce weight.

The 300 series was awarded the Laurel Prize in May 1993.

Variants
 300-9000 series: 16-car pre-series set
 300-0 series: 16-car "J" sets owned by JR Central, introduced from March 1992
 300-3000 series: 16-car "F" sets owned by JR-West

Pre-series 300-9000 series set

The pre-series unit, J0, numbered in the 300-9000 series, was delivered on 8 March 1990, and underwent extensive testing and endurance running before the start of the new Nozomi services in March 1992.

The set was modified to production standards in March 1993, becoming set "J1", but it differed from the production units in a number of ways. Visually, the driving cab had a different windscreen design, different headlight arrangement, and flared side panels over the front bogies. The prototype set was initially fitted with five pantographs, but this was later reduced to two in line with modifications to the production fleet. Limited water tank capacity meant that the unit was not capable of running return trips from Tokyo to Hakata, and was normally restricted to Tokyo to Osaka/Okayama/Hiroshima workings.

From 2001 onwards, this unit was converted for use as a JR Central test train for testing new digital ATC equipment on the Tokaido Shinkansen. It was finally withdrawn in March 2007. All cars except one end car, 322-9001, were cut up.

JR Central J sets

60 16-car sets (excluding pre-series set J1) operated by Central Japan Railway Company (JR Central). These sets were delivered between February 1992 and October 1998.

In December 1998, set J59 was fitted experimentally with new 700 series style single-arm pantographs and fairings to reduce noise and air resistance. Following testing, JR Central subsequently fitted new pantographs to all of its sets, with modifications completed by late 2002.

In October 2004, JR Central announced plans for ride improvement modifications to its 300 series fleet involving the addition of semi-active vibration control units to seven cars out of the total of sixteen in each set (end cars 1 and 16, pantograph cars 6 and 12, and Green cars 8 to 10), and also new non-linear air suspension on all cars in each set. The new secondary suspension offered firmer support against lateral movement. The entire fleet operated by JR Central received the modifications by February 2007.

With the entry into service of new N700 series trains, withdrawals of production 300 series sets began in July 2007 with the withdrawal of set J14.

The remaining fleet of JR Central 300 series sets were removed from regular scheduled services from 1 February 2012, and were completely withdrawn following the final runs on 16 March 2012.

Formation
The 16-car J sets were formed as follows, with car 1 at the Hakata end.

Cars 6 and 12 each had one single-arm pantograph.

Interior

JR-West F sets (300-3000 series)
These were 16-car 300 series sets operated by West Japan Railway Company (JR-West). A total of nine sets were delivered between December 1992 and September 1993.

Withdrawals of the JR-West F sets began in July 2011, with the withdrawal of set F5. The last remaining sets were withdrawn by spring 2012 and replaced by eight 700 series "C" sets transferred from JR Central.

Formation
The 16-car F sets were formed as follows, with car 1 at the Hakata end.

Cars 6 and 12 each had one single-arm pantograph.

Interior

History
 January 1988: Development project commenced.
 8 March 1990: Pre-series 300-9000 series set (J0) was delivered.
 April 1990: Test running started.
 October 1990: Speed of 303.1 km/h was recorded during test running.
 1 March 1991: Speed of 325.7 km/h was recorded during test running.
 July 1991: Endurance test running started. (Continued until March 1992.)
 February 1992: First production set (J2) was delivered.
 March 1992: Entry into service on Tokaido Shinkansen Nozomi services running at a maximum speed of 270 km/h.
 June 1992: 300-9000 series set was tested on Sanyo Shinkansen.
 December 1992: First JR-West 300-3000 series (F) set was delivered.
 March 1993: Hourly through Nozomi services were introduced between Tokyo and Hakata.
 10 March 1993: Pre-series set J0 was modified to full-production standard and renumbered J1.
 May 1993: Awarded the Laurel Prize in May 1993.
 April 1994: Sets from J16 onward delivered with regular sliding doors in place of earlier plug doors.
 August 1995: Sets from J30 onward delivered with two pantographs in place of the earlier three. Modifications started on earlier sets to reduce number of pantographs to two.
 March 1996: Maximum speed of Hikari services was raised to 270 km/h.
 October 1998: 300 series production ended.
 September 1999: Modifications started (from set J9) to convert pantographs to single-arm type with shrouds resembling 700 series design.
 December 2001: 300 series removed from regularly scheduled Nozomi services.
 July 2007: First 300 series set (J14) was withdrawn from service.
 July 2011: First JR-West F set (F5) was withdrawn from service.
 16 March 2012: The last remaining sets were withdrawn following their last runs.

Source:

Preserved examples
 322-9001 (ex-prototype set J1, built 1990 by Hitachi) at the SCMaglev and Railway Park, Nagoya, since March 2011.
 323-20 (ex-set J21, built 1993 by Nippon Sharyo) formerly at the SCMaglev and Railway Park, Nagoya, from March 2011, removed in December 2013.

 323-45 (ex-set J46, built 1997 by Kawasaki Heavy Industries) at the Shinkansen Service & Technology Co., Ltd., Osaka, from June 2010.

See also
List of high speed trains

References

External links

Shinkansen train series
Hitachi multiple units
Central Japan Railway Company
West Japan Railway Company
Train-related introductions in 1992
Passenger trains running at least at 250 km/h in commercial operations
Kinki Sharyo multiple units
25 kV AC multiple units
Nippon Sharyo multiple units
Kawasaki multiple units